Henry Lee Warren (born October 16, 1922) is a retired United States Air Force major general who served as deputy chief of staff, operations, Air Training Command.

References

1922 births
Living people
United States Air Force generals